HDMS Freja is a Diana-class large ocean patrol vessel belonging to the Royal Danish Navy.

Freja is the second patrol vessel in the Diana class and is built to patrol in the Danish territorial waters. It is designed by Hauschildt Marine in cooperation with Danish Defense Acquisition and Logistics Organization and Faaborg Værft A/S. The ship is named after the Norse fertility goddess Freya. Freja is, like all its sister ships, built in Faaborg yard. The ship was named at a ceremony at Naval Base Korsør by General Jesper Helsø, Defense Chief.

Freja is the fifth ship to bear the name in Danish service:

 Freya (frigate, 1795-1807)
 Freya (frigate, 1824-1853)
 Freya (paddle steamer, 1864-1864)
 A541 Freja (surveying ship, 1939-1967)
 P521 Freja (patrol vessel, 2008 - till date)

Functions
The main task performed by Freja are:

 Surveillance
 Maintaining of sovereignty
 Search and Rescue
 Diving sickness management
 Environmental protection
 Assistance to the Police
 Explosive Ordnance Disposal

References

Sources
Freja Specs in Naval History 
HDMS Freja Specs in Danish Naval Site
Freja in Danish Wikipedia
Info of the ship
Freja Info

Ships built in Denmark
2006 ships
Diana-class patrol vessels